New Salem is the name of several places in Illinois:
New Salem, now also known as Lincoln's New Salem, a recreated former village in Menard County
New Salem Township, McDonough County, Illinois
New Salem, Pike County, Illinois
New Salem Township, Pike County, Illinois

See also
New Salem (disambiguation)